Captain George Barrington (20 November 1794 – 2 January 1835) was a Royal Navy officer and Whig politician.

Career
Barrington served in the Royal Navy becoming Fourth Naval Lord in 1830. He was elected at the 1832 general election as a member of parliament (MP) for Sunderland, but resigned his seat in 1833 through the procedural device of appointment as Steward of the Chiltern Hundreds.

Family
In 1827 he married Lady Caroline Grey, daughter of Charles Grey, 2nd Earl Grey; they had a son and a daughter.

References

External links 
 

1794 births
1835 deaths
Royal Navy officers
Whig (British political party) MPs for English constituencies
Members of the Parliament of the United Kingdom for English constituencies
UK MPs 1832–1835
Younger sons of viscounts
Lords of the Admiralty